Dadu (Sindhi and ), is a city and the capital of Dadu District located in Sindh, Pakistan.  The city is located on the western bank of River Indus and is administratively subdivided into three Union councils. 

Dadu is the 11th largest city of Sindh Province and 52nd largest city in Pakistan with a population of 171,191 (2017). It is located 100 miles (160 km) to the north of Hyderabad, the second largest city of Sindh.

History 
The early history of this city is unknown. It is generally believed that Dadu was founded as a village by Syed Dad Muhammad Shah Alias Dadu Shah during the Kalhora dynasty (1701–1783). Dadu Shah was a powerful religious leader and landlord and had close relations with Kalhora rulers. Some historians are of the opinion that the old name of Dadu was Marakhpur which was conquered by Mian Yar Muhammad Kalhoro during the first decade of the 18th century. Nowadays, Marakhpur is a small locality in Dadu City.  

There is also another theory regarding the origin of Dadu. Dadu Dayal (1544-1603) was a great saint, poet, and follower of Guru Gorakhnath from Gujrat, India. He introduced  a new Panth of Yogi known as the Dadu-Panth. Dadu Dayal visited Sindh and lived here for a long time. His followers were called Dadunavasi. Two of his followers, Dayo Ram (1836-1906) and Sanat Bhagat Ram, were from Dadu. Dadu became the town of the Danunavasi and hence got the name Dadu.

During the Kalhora dynasty, Dadu and the surrounding area's fortunes flourished, the irrigation system was improved, and new canals were constructed to boost the agricultural economy of the area. As a result, Dadu became an important centre of trade and agriculture. When Kalhora rulers shifted the capital of Sindh to Hydrabad, Dadu lost its prosperity. In Talpur rule,the glory of Dadu further declined. The Talpur rulers were more focussed towards Hyderabad, Khairpur Mirs and Mirpur Khas. They did not pay much attention towards Dadu and surrounding areas.

References 

Populated places in Dadu District